509 may refer to:

 509 (number)
 509, the year
 509 Harbourfront, a streetcar route in Toronto
 509th Operations Group, the 509th Operations Group of the USAAF
 509 error, an unofficial HTTP response code meaning bandwidth exceeded
 Area code 509, a telephone area code
 FN 509, a semi-automatic pistol manufactured by FN Herstal
 x.509, a public key infrastructure certificate standard